Virginia United Football Club is an American amateur soccer team based in Woodbridge, Virginia. The club plays in the amateur Woodbridge Virginia Adult Soccer League, and earned recognition in 2019 when they qualified for the 2019 U.S. Open Cup.

History

2019 Open Cup run 
The club put together a remarkable run during the 2019 U.S. Open Cup qualification stages to earn their first ever berth into the U.S. Open Cup, the national cup competition in the United States (similar to the FA Cup). On October 21, 2018; Virginia United opened their qualification with a 2–0 victory against Super Delegates of Maryland.

In the third qualifying round, played on November 18, 2018; United played Christos FC. Christos, which is highly composed of former college soccer players, received Open Cup notoriety in 2017 for their run in the 2017 U.S. Open Cup. United won the match 2–1 to advance to the fourth and final qualifying round in April 2019.

Club

Roster

Coaching staff 
 Head coach: Jimmy Ramos

References 

Association football clubs established in 2018
Soccer clubs in Virginia
Prince William County, Virginia
2018 establishments in Virginia